6th National Assembly may refer to:

 6th National Assembly of France
 6th National Assembly of Laos
 6th National Assembly of Namibia
 6th National Assembly of Nigeria
 6th National Assembly of Serbia
 6th National Assembly of Slovenia